Range Warfare is a 1934 American Western film directed by S. Roy Luby.

Cast 
Lafayette Russell as Reb Russell, aka The Whistler
Rebel as Rebel, Reb's Horse
Lucille Lund as Sue Callahan
Hal Taliaferro as Tommy Lord
Roger Williams as Jess Monroe
Slim Whitaker as Sheriff Curt Turner
Lafe McKee as Wade Callahan
Eddie Boland as Jack Brady
Dick Botiller as Little Feather
Ed Porter as Martin 'Deke' DeKalb
Gene Alsace as Jerry Blake
Chief Blackhawk as "'Injun" Joe

External links 

1934 films
American black-and-white films
1934 Western (genre) films
American Western (genre) films
Films directed by S. Roy Luby
1930s English-language films
1930s American films